Vladimir Ivanovich Kurenbin (born 15 May 1946) is a former figure skater for the Soviet Union. He is the 1964 Prague Skate bronze medalist, the 1967 Blue Swords silver medalist, and a five-time Soviet national medalist. A native of Leningrad, he was coached by Igor Moskvin. His only major international competition was the 1968 European Championships, where he finished tenth.

Results

References
 Skatabase

1946 births
Soviet male single skaters
Figure skaters from Saint Petersburg
Living people